The Regency Bridge, locally known as the "Swinging Bridge," is a one-lane suspension bridge over the Colorado River in Texas. It is located at the intersection of Mills County Road 433 and San Saba County Road 137, both gravel roads, near a small community called Regency. The bridge spans the Colorado River between Mills and San Saba counties.

History
It was built in 1939, with most of the work being done by hand. An earlier bridge constructed in 1903 collapsed under the weight of a herd of cattle, and a later bridge built in 1936 washed away in a flood. The Regency Bridge was restored by James Harris in 1997, with then-Governor Bush attending the re-dedication service. This was a major event for the community of around 25 people.

Local teenagers accidentally set the wood surface on fire on December 29, 2003, burning a hole in some planks and causing $20,000 in damage. The bridge was repaired and reopened to traffic in early 2005. After closing in late 2014, the bridge is once again open to traffic. After a closure in Sept 2020 due to structural damage, the bridge was re-opened to traffic in May 2021.

In 2005, the Regency Bridge became the last suspension bridge in Texas open to automobile traffic.

Commemoration
A nearby historical marker, located on the southeast side of the intersection of FM 574 and Mills County Road 433 (which is just east of the intersection of FM 45 and FM 574) reads:

In popular culture
The bridge is included in the opening credits for Texas Country Reporter.
In 2017 Regency Bridge was featured on an episode of The Daytripper with Chet Garner as part of the San Saba episode.  
In 2005, Alton and Sue Watson founded the There's Something In The Water Songwriter Festival featuring musicians and songwriters from Texas, Oklahoma, and other regions. The annual festival was held for 12 years on the third weekend in April at an old campground located on the Mills County side of the river.
World Without Waves was filmed in the area and featured the Regency bridge in several scenes.

Gallery

See also

List of bridges documented by the Historic American Engineering Record in Texas
List of bridges on the National Register of Historic Places in Texas
National Register of Historic Places listings in Mills County, Texas
National Register of Historic Places listings in San Saba County, Texas

References

External links

Bridges completed in 1939
Suspension bridges in Texas
Buildings and structures in Mills County, Texas
Transportation in Mills County, Texas
Road bridges on the National Register of Historic Places in Texas
Buildings and structures in San Saba County, Texas
Transportation in San Saba County, Texas
Historic American Engineering Record in Texas
National Register of Historic Places in Mills County, Texas
National Register of Historic Places in San Saba County, Texas
Texas State Antiquities Landmarks
Bridges over the Colorado River (Texas)
Towers in Texas
1939 establishments in Texas